Hallberg-Rassy Varvsaktiebolag (HR) is a Swedish shipyard internationally known for producing high quality blue water sailing yachts. The company's yard is located in Ellös on the island of Orust, Västra Götaland.

History
Harry Hallberg founded his yard in 1943, and in 1965 Christoph Rassy founded a yard, in premises recently vacated by Hallberg. Harry Hallberg’s most distinguished contribution was his understanding of the advantages of using GRP and to build boats in a series. Hallberg-Rassy was formed when Rassy purchased the Hallberg yard after Harry Halberg's retirement in 1972. Since 1989 all boats have been designed by the Argentinian engineer and yacht designer Germán Frers. To date, more than 9,400 yachts have been completed by the yard. The company is owned by the Rassy family, and is managed by Magnus Rassy.

Models

Hallberg-Rassy Owners Associations 
A number of associations for current and potential owners of Hallberg-Rassy yachts are active worldwide.  They are based in the United Kingdom, Netherlands, Denmark and Norway. The associations promote sailing, regattas, information exchange, social and other activities.
They include:

 Hallberg-Rassy Owners Group, global discussion board with 791 members. Contains a large searchable database on a range of HR related discussions and documents. Restricted to Hallberg-Rassy owners and their regular crew.

 The Hallberg-Rassy Owners Association, based in the United Kingdom.

 Hallberg-Rassy Connectie, based in the Netherlands including members from Germany and Belgium.

Regattas
HR hosts annual Hallberg-Rassy Regattas in Sweden, plus a number of regattas have been held in the UK, the Netherlands, in the USA and in Italy.

See also
 List of sailboat designers and manufacturers

References

External links
 

Hallberg-Rassy
Companies based in Västra Götaland County